Isola Polvese or Polvese Island is an island situated in the southeastern part of Lake Trasimeno and is the largest of the three islands of the lake. The area is of historical and naturalistic interest. Today, the island belongs to the Province of Perugia and is known as a Scientific-Didactic Park, which is a part of Trasimeno Regional Park. The island is a part of Castiglione del Lago.

History 
The island was visited by the Etruscans and the Romans. In the Middle Ages, the inhabitants submitted to Perugia. During that period, some churches and a castle were erected to protect and defend the village. Monks of the Benedictine and Dominican orders were present on the island. In 1841, the island became private property and was used as a hunting area. In 1973, the Province of Perugia acquired Polvese Island.

Monuments 
Among the most important monuments of the island are the church of Saint Giuliano and Saint Secondo, the Olivetans’ Monastery, and the Medieval Castle. The Garden of Aquatic Plants was realized in 1959 by the architect Pietro Porcinai.

Landscape 
In the northern part, a huge oak woodland covers the island with many plant varieties, typically of the Mediterranean area, such as holm and ash trees. In the lower woods, trees like guelder rose, laurel, ilex, and privet can be found. The southern area is covered by a huge olive grove with centuries-old olive trees. The humid area is characterized by an extended reed thicket that grows along from the east to the south. Ornamental plants and trees are present all along the meadows while rosemary hedges and pomegranate characterize the paths and the inner parts of the island. The natural environs lodge a rich fauna of invertebrates, especially insects. Among the vertebrates, there are the fox, the marten, the hare, the nutria, and a wide variety of birds, particularly the ones, that live in humid climates such as coots, ducks, and herons.

Activities 
The island offers today an example of management according to the criteria of sustainability. The activities offered by the Environmental Experience Center on the island concern didactic and environmental tourism.

Structures & services
 Great hall and Laboratory
 Punto Verde – Information
 Environmental Education Operators
 Service, Restoration, and Bar
 Hotel “La Villa”  (55 beds)
 Youth Hostel “Fattoria Il Poggio” (90 beds)
 Umbria Mobilità – Public Boat Service

External links 
The official website of the Polvese Island Centre of Environmental Experience
 "Isola Polvese - Where We Are". Fattoria il Poggio

Landforms of Umbria
Province of Perugia
Islands of the Trasimeno Lake
Lake islands of Italy
Castiglione del Lago